Course equivalency is the term used in higher education describing how a course offered by one college or university relates to a course offered by another. If a course is viewed as equal or more challenging in subject and course material than the course offered by the receiving college or university, the course can be noted as an equivalent course. A course equivalency can be unilateral, meaning it is deemed equivalent by the receiver.  Or, it could be bilateral, meaning both sender and receiver acknowledge their acceptance of each other's course as equivalent.  The methods and measures used to determine course equivalency vary by institution, state, region and country.

Background
College transfer often requires the determination and evaluation of prior course learning.  Receiving institutions usually maintain course equivalency tables listing how courses equate by sender institution.  Unless the receiving institution maintains an online public reference to the course equivalency tables, students have difficulty ascertaining transferability of their credit experiences. As a result, student transitions from sender to receiver can be very problematic. This has led a number of states to initiate legislate reforms, regulations and mandates to augment the tracking of course equivalencies. A variety of statistics, studies, and initiatives have been documented (see References).

The most common course attributes evaluated to determine course equivalency are description, academic credits, accreditation, type of instructor, method of instruction, level of instruction, learning outcomes, grade scale and grade earned, pre-requisites, co-requisites and textbook.  This is not an exclusive list of course attributes. Generally, faculty perform the determination of course equivalencies.  Course equivalency decisions can often be appealed by presenting evidence to an academic department.

See also
College transfer
Articulation (education)
Career college
Community college
Junior college
University
List of colleges and universities

References

Council for Higher Education Accreditation (CHEA). (2000). A Statement to the Community: Transfer and the Public Interest. Available at https://web.archive.org/web/20121030030718/http://www.chea.org/pdf/transfer_state_02.pdf. 

National Center for Education Statistics. (2005) The Road Less Traveled? Students Who Enroll in Multiple Institutions. Retrieved from http://nces.ed.gov/pubs2005/2005157.pdf.

External links
 Transferology Course Equivalency Lookup

 
Didactics
Academic transfer